Chalcone is the organic compound C6H5C(O)CH=CHC6H5. It is an α,β-unsaturated ketone. A variety of important biological compounds are known collectively as chalcones or chalconoids. As bioactive substances, fluorescent materials, and chemical intermediates, they are widely known. Chalcones have been used in medicinal chemistry as antioxidants, anticancer agents, diabetes medications, antiviral agents, antimalarial agents, and more. Aside from being utilized as medicines, they may also be employed as liquid crystals, fluorescent scaffolds, metal sensors, corrosion inhibitors, and plant growth promoters.

Chemical properties 
Chalcones have two absorption maxima at 280 nm and 340 nm.

Synthesis 
Chalcone is usually prepared by an aldol condensation between benzaldehyde and acetophenone.

This reaction, which can be carried out without any solvent, is so reliable that it is used in as an example of green chemistry in undergraduate education.

Biosynthesis
Chalcones and chalconoids are synthesized in plants as secondary metabolites. The enzyme chalcone synthase, a type III polyketide synthase, is responsible for the biosynthesis of these compounds. The enzyme is found in all "higher" (vascular) and several "lower" (non-vascular) plants.

Potential pharmacology
Chalcones and their derivatives demonstrate a wide range of biological activities including anti-inflammation.  Some 2′-amino chalcones have been studied as potential antitumor agents. Chalcones are of interest in medicinal chemistry and have been described as a privileged scaffold.

Organic chemistry 
chalcones have been used as intermediates in heterocyclic synthesis, especially in the synthesis of pyrazoles, aurones etc.

See also
 Juliá–Colonna epoxidation

References

External links
 Chalcone on reference.md 

Chalconoids
Phenyl compounds
Enones